A Letter to Elia is a 2010 documentary film directed by Kent Jones and Martin Scorsese that follows the life and career of film director Elia Kazan and how he influenced Scorsese. Made from clips from films, stills, readings from Kazan's autobiography, a speech he wrote on directing read by Elias Koteas, a videotaped interview done late in Kazan's life, and Scorsese's commentary on and off screen.

Accolades 
2010 Peabody Award Winner

References

External links
 
 A Letter to Elia @PBS.org

2010 films
2010s English-language films
American documentary films
Documentary films about film directors and producers
Films directed by Martin Scorsese
2010 documentary films
Films produced by Martin Scorsese
Films directed by Kent Jones
2010s American films